U.S. Route 1 (US 1) is a major north–south U.S. Route through the U.S. state of Rhode Island, specifically within the Providence metropolitan area. Staying close to the Atlantic Ocean and Narragansett Bay, it is a longer route than Interstate 95 (I-95), and many portions are a four-lane divided highway.

Route description

US 1 enters Rhode Island via a small bridge from Pawcatuck, Connecticut, to downtown Westerly. US 1 winds through downtown Westerly, passing two shopping plazas (the Granite Street Shopping Center and the Franklin Shopping Plaza) prior to a junction with Route 78, the two-lane highway designed to bypass downtown. A right onto Airport Road at this intersection provides access to Westerly State Airport, Watch Hill, and Misquamicut. US 1 continues to Dunn's Corners, with Langworthy Road providing more beach access.

The road then becomes a divided highway shortly after, with Route 1A merging into the highway from the Misquamicut area. US 1 then crosses into Charlestown near Shelter Harbor. After stoplight intersections with Ross Hill Road (Route 216), West Beach Road (providing access to Quonochontaug), East Beach Road (providing access to Blue Shutters Town Beach and East Beach), and Wildflower Road, there are no more stoplights until the end of the freeway after the Wakefield-Peacedale exits. Access to exits on the opposite side of the road are provided through U-turn ramps. The southbound side has junction with Prosser Trail, a road leading to Burlingame State Park. Burlingame access is also located prior to the East Beach Road exit. An exit for Route 1A on the northbound side leads to Ningret Park and the police station. US 1 bends to the right. On the southbound side is Kings Factory Road. Another junction with Route 1A occurs on US 1 north. Route 1A merges onto US 1 from the south, briefly, before exiting and continuing north to Cross Mills. US 1 north then features a ramp, providing access to Cross Mills and Route 1A—leading to Charlestown Breachway State and Charlestown Town beaches—for those just merging in on a U-turn from US 1 south via a junction with Route 2/Route 112 (South County Trail).

Another set of U-turn ramps is located for access to Route 2 and Route 112. After northbound junctions with more beach access roads (Falcone Lane, Narrow Lane, which is split in half by the highway, the other half continuing on the southbound side that leads to South County Trail), US 1 continues into South Kingstown, where Green Hill Beach Road (Route 1A) meets US 1 on the northbound side and Post Road (also Route 1A) meets US 1 south. After a junction with Moonstone Beach Road (northbound side leads to the Trustom Pond National Wildlife Refuge, southbound side leads to Perryville), Route 110 meets US 1 south. Prior to this on the southbound side, Route 1A meets US 1. Back to the northbound side, where Matunuck Beach Road is found, leading to the beachside community of Matunuck.

Following this is Succotash Road, which leads to Jerusalem, Snug Harbor, and East Matunuck State Beach. Then comes Post Road, leading to the signed destination, Jerry Brown Farm Road. Another Post Road/Route 1A junction comes on US 1 north, before it meets the highway again after a brief exitless stint. US 1 south's junction with Post Road/Route 1A north leads to Wakefield and Peace Dale. The road becomes a freeway and has two exits for the Salt Pond/South County Hospital area. 

A third exit leads to Route 108 and Narragansett's town beach, Galilee, and Point Judith. A Wakefield exit marks the end of the freeway. Access to South County Commons comes soon. Route 138 meets from the west and stays on in the concurrency until the exits for access to the Jamestown Verrazzano Bridge and Jamestown and the Claiborne Pell Newport Bridge and Newport. US 1 then meets Route 4, a thruway leading to I-95.

History

Except north of Downtown, where US 1 was built as the Providence and Pawtucket Turnpike (now Main Street), the highway was never a turnpike road. Portions are the old Boston Post Road, while other parts were built as bypasses, leaving the old road as US 1A. The turnpike south of Providence—the Providence and Pawcatuck and Hopkinton and Richmond turnpikes—followed the diagonal route that I-95 now takes.

Major intersections

References

01
 1 Rhode Island
Transportation in Washington County, Rhode Island
Transportation in Kent County, Rhode Island
Transportation in Providence County, Rhode Island